OpenGL for Embedded Systems (OpenGL ES or GLES) is a subset of the OpenGL computer graphics rendering application programming interface (API) for rendering 2D and 3D computer graphics such as those used by video games, typically hardware-accelerated using a graphics processing unit (GPU). It is designed for embedded systems like smartphones, tablet computers, video game consoles and PDAs. OpenGL ES is the "most widely deployed 3D graphics API in history".

The API is cross-language and multi-platform. The GLU library and the original GLUT are not available for OpenGL ES, freeglut however, supports it. OpenGL ES is managed by the non-profit technology consortium Khronos Group. Vulkan, a next-generation API from Khronos, is made for simpler high performance drivers for mobile and desktop devices.

Versions
Several versions of the OpenGL ES specification now exist. OpenGL ES 1.0 is drawn up against the OpenGL 1.3 specification, OpenGL ES 1.1 is defined relative to the OpenGL 1.5 specification and OpenGL ES 2.0 is defined relative to the OpenGL 2.0 specification. This means that, for example, an application written for OpenGL ES 1.0 should be easily portable to the desktop OpenGL 1.3; as the OpenGL ES is a stripped-down version of the API, the reverse may or may not be true, depending on the particular features used.

OpenGL ES comes with its own version of shading language (OpenGL ES SL), which is different from OpenGL SL.

Version 1.0 and 1.1 both have common (CM) and common lite (CL) profiles, the difference being that the common lite profile only supports fixed-point instead of floating point data type support, whereas common supports both.

OpenGL ES 1.0
OpenGL ES 1.0 was released publicly July 28, 2003. OpenGL ES 1.0 is based on the original OpenGL 1.3 API, with much functionality removed and a little bit added. One significant difference between OpenGL and OpenGL ES is that OpenGL ES removed the need to bracket OpenGL library calls with glBegin and glEnd.  Other significant differences are that the calling semantics for primitive rendering functions were changed in favor of vertex arrays, and  fixed-point data types were introduced for vertex coordinates.  Attributes were also added to better support the computational abilities of embedded processors, which often lack a floating point unit (FPU). Many other functions and rendering primitives were removed in version 1.0 to produce a lightweight interface, including:

 quad and polygon rendering primitives;
 texgen, line, and polygon stipple;
 polygon mode and antialiased polygon rendering are not supported, although rendering using multisample is still possible (rather than alpha border fragments);
 ARB_Image pixel class operations, bitmaps, and 3D textures are not supported;
 several of the more technical drawing modes are eliminated, including frontbuffer and accumulation buffer;
 bitmap operations for copying pixels individually, evaluators, and user selection operations are not allowed;
 display lists and feedback are removed, as are push and pop operations for state attributes;
 and some material parameters were removed, including back-face parameters and user-defined clip planes.

The actual version is 1.0.0.2.

OpenGL ES 1.1
OpenGL ES 1.1 added features such as mandatory support for multitexture, better multitexture support (including combiners and dot product texture operations), automatic mipmap generation, vertex buffer objects, state queries, user clip planes, and greater control over point rendering.
Actual Version is 1.1.12.

OpenGL ES 2.0
OpenGL ES 2.0 was publicly released in March 2007. It is roughly based on OpenGL 2.0, but it eliminates most of the fixed-function rendering pipeline in favor of a programmable one in a move similar to the transition from OpenGL 3.0 to 3.1. Control flow in shaders is generally limited to forward branching and to loops where the maximum number of iterations can easily be determined at compile time. Almost all rendering features of the transform and lighting stage, such as the specification of materials and light parameters formerly specified by the fixed-function API, are replaced by shaders written by the graphics programmer. As a result, OpenGL ES 2.0 is not backward compatible with OpenGL ES 1.1. Some incompatibilities between the desktop version of OpenGL and OpenGL ES 2.0 persisted until OpenGL 4.1, which added the GL_ARB_ES2_compatibility extension.
Actual version is 2.0.25.

The Khronos Group has written a document describing the differences between OpenGL ES 2.0 and ordinary OpenGL 2.0.

OpenGL ES 3.0
The OpenGL ES 3.0 specification was publicly released in August 2012. OpenGL ES 3.0 is backwards compatible with OpenGL ES 2.0, enabling applications to incrementally add new visual features to applications. OpenGL 4.3 provides full compatibility with OpenGL ES 3.0. Version 3.0 is also the basis for WebGL 2.0.
The actual is version 3.0.6.

New functionality in the OpenGL ES 3.0 specification includes:
 multiple enhancements to the rendering pipeline to enable acceleration of advanced visual effects including: occlusion queries, transform feedback, instanced rendering and support for four or more rendering targets,
 high quality ETC2 / EAC texture compression as a standard feature, eliminating the need for a different set of textures for each platform,
 a new version of the GLSL ES shading language  with full support for integer and 32-bit floating point operations;
 greatly enhanced texturing functionality including guaranteed support for floating point textures, 3D textures, depth textures, vertex textures, NPOT textures, R/RG textures, immutable textures, 2D array textures, swizzles, LOD and mip level clamps, seamless cube maps and sampler objects,
 an extensive set of required, explicitly sized texture and render-buffer formats, reducing implementation variability and making it much easier to write portable applications.

OpenGL ES 3.1
The OpenGL ES 3.1 specification was publicly released in March 2014.
New functionality in OpenGL ES 3.1 includes: 
 Compute shaders
 Independent vertex and fragment shaders
 Indirect draw commands

OpenGL ES 3.1 is backward compatible with OpenGL ES 2.0 and 3.0, thus enabling applications to incrementally incorporate new features. Actual Version is 3.1-(November 2016).

OpenGL ES 3.2
The OpenGL ES 3.2 specification was publicly released in August 2015.
New capabilities in OpenGL ES 3.2 include:
 Geometry and tessellation shaders to efficiently process complex scenes on the GPU.
 Floating point render targets for increased flexibility in higher precision compute operations.
 ASTC compression to reduce the memory footprint and bandwidth used to process textures.
 Enhanced blending for sophisticated compositing and handling of multiple color attachments.
 Advanced texture targets such as texture buffers, multisample 2D array and cube map arrays.
 Debug and robustness features for easier code development and secure execution.

Actual State is 3.2.6 July 2019.

Some more extensions are developed or in Development in Mesa for next OpenGL ES Version (see Mesamatrix).

Next generation API is Vulkan.

Platform usage
For complete list of companies and their conformant products, view here

OpenGL ES 1.0
OpenGL ES 1.0 added an official 3D graphics API to the Android and Symbian OS v8.0a operating systems, as well as by QNX It is also supported by the PlayStation 3 as one of its official graphics APIs (the other one being low level libgcm library) with Nvidia's Cg in lieu of GLSL. The PlayStation 3 also includes several features of the 2.0 version of OpenGL ES.

 Nokia 6630

OpenGL ES 1.1
The 1.1 version of OpenGL ES is supported by:
 Android 1.6
 Apple iOS for iPad, iPhone, and iPod Touch
 RIM's BlackBerry 5.0 operating system series (only BlackBerry Storm 2, BlackBerry Curve 8530 and later models have the needed hardware)
 BlackBerry PlayBook
 BlackBerry BB10
 Various Nokia phones such as Nokia N95, N93, N93i, and N82.
 The Palm webOS, using the Plug-in Development Kit
 Nintendo 3DS

OpenGL ES 2.0
Supported by:
 The Android platform since Android 2.0 through NDK and Android 2.2 through Java
 AmigaOS on AmigaOne with Warp3D Nova and compatible Radeon HD graphics card. 
 Apple iOS 5 or later in iPad, iPad Mini, iPhone 3GS or later, and iPod Touch 3rd generation or later
 BlackBerry devices with BlackBerry OS 7.0 and Blackberry 10, as well as the BlackBerry PlayBook
 Google Native Client
 Intel HD Graphics 965G / X3000 and higher (Linux)
 Nvidia (Android), Curie NV40+: Linux, Windows
 Various Nokia phones (such as Symbian^3 based Nokia N8, MeeGo based Nokia N9, and Maemo based Nokia N900)
 Palm webOS, using the Plug-in Development Kit
 The Pandora console
 The Raspberry Pi
 The Odroid
 Various Samsung mobile phones (such as the Wave)
 Web browsers (WebGL)
 The GCW Zero console
 The PlayStation Vita portable console
 The PlayStation 4 console

OpenGL ES 3.0
Supported by:
 Android since version 4.3, on devices with appropriate hardware and drivers, including:
 Nexus 7 (2013)
 Nexus 4
 Nexus 5
 Nexus 10
 HTC Butterfly S
 HTC One/One Max
 LG G2
 LG G Pad 8.3
 The Raspberry Pi 4
 Samsung Galaxy J5
 Samsung Galaxy J5 (2016)
 Samsung Galaxy S4 (Snapdragon version)
 Samsung Galaxy S5
 Samsung Galaxy Note 3
 Samsung Galaxy Note 10.1 (2014 Edition)
 Sony Xperia M
 Sony Xperia Z/ZL
 Sony Xperia Z1
 Sony Xperia Z Ultra
 Sony Xperia Tablet Z
 iOS since version 7, on devices including:
 iPhone 5S
 iPad Air
 iPad mini with Retina display
 BlackBerry 10 OS since version 10.2, on devices including:
 BlackBerry Z3
 BlackBerry Z30
 BlackBerry Passport

Supported by some recent versions of these GPUs:
 Adreno 300 and 400 series (Android, BlackBerry 10, Windows10 Windows RT)
 Mali T600 series onwards (Android, Linux, Windows 7)
 PowerVR Series6 (iOS, Linux)
 Vivante (Android, OS X 10.8.3, Windows 7)
 Nvidia (Android), Tesla G80+: Linux, Windows 7+
 Intel HD Graphics Sandy Bridge and higher (Linux)
 AMD Terascale and actual GCN-architecture (Windows, Linux)
 LLVMpipe and Softpipe: soft drivers in Mesa
 VIRGL: virtual Driver for virtual machines in 2018 with Mesa 18.1 (See Mesamatrix.net)

OpenGL ES 3.1
Supported by Windows, Linux, Android (since version 5.0) on devices with appropriate hardware and drivers, including:
 Adreno 400 series
 Adreno 500 series (Mesa 18.1 for Linux and Android)
 AMD Terascale and actual GCN-architecture (Windows, Linux (r600, radeonSI))
 Intel HD Graphics for Intel Atom Z3700 series (Android)
 Intel HD Graphics for Intel Celeron N and J series (Android)
 Intel HD Graphics for Intel Pentium N and J series (Android)
 Intel HD Graphics Haswell and higher (Linux Mesa: previous Ivy Bridge nearly without stencil texturing)
 Mali T6xx (midgard) series onwards (Android, Linux)
 Nvidia GeForce 400 series onwards (Windows, Linux)
 Nvidia Tegra K1 (Android, Linux)
 Nvidia Tegra X1 (Android)
 PowerVR Series 6, 6XE, 6XT, 7XE and 7XT (Linux, Android)
 Vivante GC2000 series onwards (optional with GC800 and GC1000)
 panfrost: ARM panfrost support (Linux Mesa 22.0)
 v3d: Driver for Broadcom ARM raspberry in Mesa (Linux)
 VIRGL: virtual Driver for virtual machines in 2018 with Mesa 18.1 (See Mesamatrix.net)
 LLVMpipe: software driver in Mesa 20.2 (Linux)
 softpipe: software driver in Mesa 20.3 (Linux)
 Zink: emulation driver in Mesa 21.1 (Linux) 
 d3d12: WSL2 linux driver for Microsoft 10+ (Mesa 22.0)

Android Extension Pack
Android Extension Pack (AEP)  is a set of OpenGL ES 3.1 extensions, all bundled into a single extension introduced by Google in 2014. This allows applications to use all of the features of the set of extensions, while only testing for the presence of a single one. The AEP was officially added to Android Lollipop to provide extra features like tessellation over what was officially in the GLES 3.1 revision. OpenGL ES 3.2 update is largely made up of the AEP additions, which are already present in desktop OpenGL.

OpenGL ES 3.2
OpenGL ES 3.2, incorporating the Android Extension Pack (AEP), "boasts a small number of improvements over last year’s OpenGL ES 3.1. Both make use of similar features from the AEP. From the AEP, OpenGL ES 3.2 compliant hardware will support Tessellation for additional geometry detail, new geometry shaders, ASTC texture compression for a smaller memory bandwidth footprint, floating point render targets for high accuracy compute processes, and new debugging features for developers. These high-end features are already found in the group’s full OpenGL 4 specification."

Supported by Windows, Linux, Android (since version 6.0 possible, 7.0+ Vulkan 1.0 and OpenGL ES 3.2 needed) on devices with appropriate hardware and drivers, including:
 Adreno 420 and newer (Android, Linux (freedreno))
 AMD GCN-architecture (Windows, Linux (Mesa 18.2 with radeonSI))
 Intel HD Graphics Skylake and higher (Linux)
 Mali-T760 and newer (Android, Linux)
 Nvidia GeForce 400 series (Fermi) and newer (Windows, Linux)
 VIRGL: virtual Driver for virtual machines in 2018 with Mesa 18.1 (See Mesamatrix.net)
 LLVMpipe: software driver in Mesa 20 (Linux)
 Zink: Vulkan emulation driver in Mesa 21.2 (Linux)

Deprecation in Apple devices
OpenGL ES (and OpenGL) is deprecated in Apple's operating systems, but still works in up to at least iOS 12.

The future
There is currently no plan for a new core version of OpenGL ES, as adoption of Vulkan has been deemed to displace it in embedded and mobile applications. Development of extensions to OpenGL ES continues as of 2017.

OpenGL compatibility

A few libraries have been created to emulate OpenGL calls using GL ES:
 Nvidia offers a 2-clause BSD licensed library called Regal, originally started by Cass Everitt. It was last updated in 2016. Regal is used for example by Google's NaCl.
 The MIT licensed GL4ES emulates OpenGL 2.1/1.5 using GL ES 2.0/1.1. It is based on glshim.

See also
 Direct3D – Windows API for high-performance 3D graphics, with 3D acceleration hardware support
 DirectX – Windows API for handling tasks related to graphics and video
 Metal – low level, high-performance 3D accelerated graphics library for Apple devices
 OpenSL ES – API for audio on embedded systems, developed by the Khronos Group
 ANGLE (software) – Google developed library to turn OpenGL ES calls into those of DirectX or Vulkan

References

Further reading

External links

 
 Public bug tracking
 OpenGL ES Conformant companies
 Public forums
 List of OpenGL ES compatible devices
 OpenGL home page
 OpenGL ES 1.1 & 2.0 Emulator from ARM  Link unusable. Do not click.
 OpenGL ES 3.0 Emulator from ARM Link unusable. Do not click.

3D graphics APIs
Es